Aspergillus micronesiensis is a species of fungus in the genus Aspergillus. It is from the Flavipedes section. The species was first described in 2014.

References 

micronesiensis
Fungi described in 2014